Cochlicella acuta, common name the pointed snail, is a species of small but very high-spired, air-breathing land snail, a pulmonate gastropod mollusk in the family Geomitridae.

Distribution
This species is native to parts of Europe. It inhabits south-western Europe including Spain, Portugal, Italy, and western Europe including France, Belgium, Netherlands and the British Isles.

In the British Isles it lives in dunes, sandhills, and grassy downs close to the sea, chiefly in the south and west of England, Wales, on islands off the west coast of Scotland, and along the Irish coast. It is extremely abundant in some areas.

The species has been introduced in the eastern Mediterranean, including Greece, Israel and Egypt.

It has also been introduced to Australia, where it has become a problematic invasive, or pest species.

Habitat

This species does well on sandy calcareous soils, and often prefers a coastal setting such as sand dunes. It aestivates by attaching itself to vertical surfaces such as fence posts, tall weeds and so on.

Shell description
The shell of this species is an unusual shape for a helicid, elongatedly conical, 10 to 20 mm high, with a width of only 4 to 7 mm. The spire tapers regularly, but ends in a blunt tip. The oval aperture has a thin lip, and the narrow umbilicus is almost covered.

The shell is very variable in color and markings, often having a cream or off-white background with many pale brown blotches, which are sometimes organized into spiral bands. The shell is often streaked across the whorls with brown. There are sometimes two spiral bands of dark brown or black, which are frequently reduced to only one band, restricted to the body-whorl. Sometimes there are no bands at all.

Welter-Schultes description.
For terms see gastropod shell
The 9-15 x 4-7 mm shell has 8-11 whorls, in juvenile specimens with a sharp edge. It is evenly white or with brown spots. The shell is less brownish, more slender and higher than the shell of  Cochlicella barbara and upper whorls are slightly more rounded in C. acuta (juveniles have a much sharper edge at the periphery of the lowest whorl). The animal is very light yellowish, dorsum with blackish brown pigments, one dark medial line on dorsum, two dark lines (= retractor muscles) from the sides to the upper tentacles.

Ecology 
Cochlicella acuta is an intermediate host for the terrestrial trematode parasite Brachylaima cribbi.

See also 
 List of invasive species.

References

 Pulteney, R. (1799). Catalogue of the birds, shells, and some of the more rare plants of Dorsetshire. London, Nichols, 92 pp.
 Provoost, S.; Bonte, D. (Ed.) (2004). Animated dunes: a view of biodiversity at the Flemish coast [Levende duinen: een overzicht van de biodiversiteit aan de Vlaamse kust]. Mededelingen van het Instituut voor Natuurbehoud, 22. Instituut voor Natuurbehoud: Brussel, Belgium. . 416, ill., appendices pp.
 Kerney, M.P., Cameron, R.A.D. & Jungbluth, J-H. (1983). Die Landschnecken Nord- und Mitteleuropas. Ein Bestimmungsbuch für Biologen und Naturfreunde, 384 pp., 24 plates.

External links
 Cochlicella acuta at Animalbase taxonomy,short description, distribution, biology,status (threats), images
 Cochlicella acuta  images at Encyclopedia of Life
Fauna Europaea Search Distribution
 Müller, O. F. (1774). Vermium terrestrium et fluviatilium, seu animalium infusorium, Helminthicorum, et testaceorum, non marinorum, succincta historia. vol 2: I-XXXVI, 1-214, 10 unnumbered pages. Havniae et Lipsiae, apud Heineck et Faber, ex officina Molleriana
 Risso A. (1826). Histoire naturelle des principales productions de l'Europe méridionale et particulièrement de celles des environs de Nice et des Alpes Maritimes, vol. 4. Paris: Levrault. vii + 439 pp., pls 1-12

Cochlicellidae
Gastropods described in 1774
Taxa named by Otto Friedrich Müller